It's a Game is a studio album by Scottish pop singer Les McKeown, released in 1989 with four corresponding singles released. After the album, Dieter Bohlen released a cover of Blue System's song "Nobody Makes Me Crazy (Like You Do)" as a single, which did not appear on the album.

Track listing
Side one
"It's a Game" (Long Version) – 5:30
"Love Is Just a Breath Away" – 3:46
"She's a Lady" (Scotch Long Version) – 4:22
"Love Hurts and Love Heals" (Long Version) – 5:05

Side two
"Looking for Love" – 4:55
"Natural Lover" – 4:40
"I Need Your Love" – 4:17
"I'll Be Your Lover" – 6:11

Personnel
Credits are adapted from the It's a Game liner notes.

Producer, Arranged By — Dieter Bohlen (tracks: 1 to 4) 
Backing Vocals — Ann Turner, Gloria Robakowski
Co-producer — Luis Rodríguez (tracks: 1 to 4) 
Engineer, Producer — Jo Dworniak (tracks: 5 to 8) 
Guitar — Paul Dunnie
Keyboards, Producer, Programmed By — Dave Clayton (tracks: 5 to 8) 
Percussion — Danny Cummings
Photography — Martin Becker
Producer — Les McKeown (tracks: 5 to 8)
Technician [Percussion Assistant] — Richard Bowling

References

External links

1989 albums
Hansa Records albums